is a Japanese pop singer-songwriter from Kitami, Hokkaido. He came out with the song "Heibon" in 2004.

Discography

Singles

Albums

Indies

External links 
 Official Web Site of Kiyofumi Ohno 
 Official Web Site by Speedstar Records 

1978 births
Living people
People from Kitami, Hokkaido
Musicians from Hokkaido
21st-century Japanese singers
21st-century Japanese male singers